Why We Hate is a six-part documentary television series which is an "exploration into the human condition of hatred and how we can overcome it." It was directed by Geeta Gandbhir and Sam Pollard and produced by Steven Spielberg's Amblin Television and Alex Gibney's Jigsaw Productions. It was released on the Discovery Channel on October 13, 2019.

On June 17, 2020, it was announced that a TV special titled Why We Hate: The Reckoning would premiere four days later.

Episodes

Production
Spielberg has long been interested in an exploration of humanity's capacity for hatred and how it can be overcome. According to Spielberg, "Getting to the root of the human condition is something I find not only fascinating, but absolutely necessary in understanding who we are. With the team in place, we delve into historical and modern-day stories of hate, traveling around the globe to uncover its mystery in others and in ourselves. If we understand why we act the way we do, we can change the way we act. That is what we are uniquely capable of as human beings." Why We Hate has been in development for the past four years.

References

2010s American documentary television series
2019 American television series debuts
2019 American television series endings
American documentary television films
Discovery Channel original programming
Films about social issues
Television series by Amblin Entertainment